Richard "Bigo" Barnett (born ) is a convicted felon who took part in the January 6 United States Capitol attack. A photograph of Barnett with his feet on a desk in Nancy Pelosi’s office in the Capitol building became one of the most prominent images of the January 6th attack.

In 2023, he was convicted of eight crimes, including four felonies. He is scheduled to be sentenced on May 3, 2023.

Career and activism 
Barnett described himself as a retired Memphis firefighter although  Memphis Fire Services were unable to verify the statement. His lawyer described him as a window salesman.

Barnett has described himself as the co-founder of the 2A NWA STAND, pro-second amendment rights group. In September 2020, Barnett was questioned by Fayetteville police who were called in connection with Barnett open-carrying weapons.

January 6 United States Capitol attack 
On January 6, 2021, Barnett put his feet on a desk in House Speaker Nancy Pelosi’s office, after trespassing into the U.S. Capitol armed with a stun gun. Barnett also wrote a note for Pelosi and left it on her desk. The note read:"Nancy, Bigo was here bi-otch."
After the attack, Barnett boasted about his actions online, including stealing an envelope. He spent six minutes in the building.

On January 8, 2021, Barnett was arrested. He was indicted on January 29 of four misdemeanour and four felony charges: disorderly conduct; "obstruction of an official proceeding; aiding and abetting; entering and remaining in a restricted building or grounds with a deadly or dangerous weapon; parading, demonstrating or picketing in a capitol building; and theft of government property." On February 4, 2021, Barnett pleaded not guilty to all charges.

Judge Christopher “Casey” Cooper allowed Barnett to be released from jail on April 27 2021, warning him that it was a test, and noting Barnett's "outlandish behavior and attempts to avoid detection after the riot, brandishing of guns in public, taking a stun gun into the Capitol and his possible adherence to some QAnon conspiracy theories".

His Washington D.C. criminal trial was one of the highest profile prosecutions of a January 6 rioter.

After approximately two hours of jury deliberation, Barnett was found guilty of all charges in January 2023, including civil disorder and obstruction of an official proceeding. He is scheduled to be sentenced on May 3, 2023.

Personal life 
Barnett lives in Gravette, Arkansas. He was aged 62 in 2023.

See also 
 Criminal proceedings in the January 6 United States Capitol attack

References

External links 
 Richard Barnett - Twitter
 Richard Barnett - official website

American firefighters
People from Gravette, Arkansas
Convicted participants in the January 6 United States Capitol attack
21st-century American criminals
Criminals from Arkansas
American male criminals
American people convicted of theft
Living people
1960s births